Iserlohn station is located in central Iserlohn in the German state of North Rhine-Westphalia. It is at the end of two single-track lines, the Ardey Railway (Ardeybahn) from Dortmund and Schwerte and the line from Iserlohn-Letmathe with services from Essen via Hagen. Since 2008, it has operated from a rebuilt station called the Stadtbahnhof (city station).

History

Iserlohn station was opened in 1864, together with the line from Letmathe, which was extended to Hemer in 1885, connecting to Fröndenberg. In 1910 the Ardey Railway to Schwerte was added. In 1966, the old station building was replaced by a new building.

The Letmathe–Fröndenberg railway between Iserlohn Ost station and Hemer was closed in 1989 because of the deterioration of a bridge on the line, which was not considered worth repairing. The line between Iserlohn and Iserlohn Ost was still used by freight trains up to 1995. Since the dismantling of the line and the removal of the last set of points, Iserlohn station has been classified as a Haltepunkt (halt). However, the Zweckverband SPNV Ruhr-Lippe (association for the promotion of public transport in Ruhr-Lippe, ZRL) intends to build a connection between the two lines, including points, which would restore its status as a bahnhof (station).

The station building of the 1960s was demolished in 2007/2008 and rebuilt as a so-called city station by a private investor. In addition to the typical tenants (ticket counter, food sales), the station building also has a tourist information office and a community college. In addition to the new station building  built in 2008, the platforms, a new bus station, a railway station forecourt and a roundabout have been built or rebuilt. There is also a parking garage with 189 parking spaces.

On 18 September 2010, the station was proclaimed the first Wanderbahnhof ("hiking station") in North Rhine-Westphalia because of its connections and proximity to hiking infrastructure.

Operations 

Platform 1 is a combined platform. Trains running on the Ardey Railway stop on one side and Märkische Verkehrsgesellschaft (Märkische Transport Company) buses stop on the other side.

Although the new station building is now a terminus, the reactivation of the line between Hemer and Iserlohn is still possible (the track would be placed between the station building and a retaining wall and would continue over the roundabout).

Iserlohn station is served by one Regional-Express and two Regionalbahn services:

Bus routes

Notes

Railway stations in North Rhine-Westphalia
Railway stations in Germany opened in 1864